Audio Push is an American hip hop duo from Inland Empire, California. The group consists of Oktane (Julian Browne) and Price (Larry Jacks, Jr.).

Career
In 2009, the duo were signed to Interscope Records, and they had their first hit single with the track, titled "Teach Me How to Jerk". In 2012, they signed with Hit-Boy's record label, named "Hits Since 87 Inc", which is a part of the Interscope Records, while it was running independently by Hit Boy.

Discography

Studio albums
 90951 (2016)
 Last Lights Left (2017)
 One Week Notice (with Dizzy Wright, Jarren Benton, Demrick, Emilio Rojas, Reezy, DJ Hoppa and Kato) (2018)
 Cloud 909 (2018)

Mixtapes 
 The Soundcheck (2009)
 The Backstage Pass (2010)
 The Intermission (2010)
 7th Letter (2011)
 My Turn (2011)
 Truth Be Told (2012)
 Inland Empire (2012)
 Come as You Are (2013)
 The Good Vibe Tribe (2015)
 My Turn II (2015)
 Inside the Vibe (2016)
 My Turn III (2017)

Extended plays 
The Stone Junction (2016)
The Throwaways (2017)
Melange (2018)

Singles

Guest appearances

References 

Hip hop groups from California
Hip hop duos
American musical duos
African-American musical groups
Musical groups established in 2008